Ten Invitations from the Mistress of Mr. E is the fourth studio album by the Canadian guitarist Rik Emmett, released in 1997. It is the first installment in a guitar trilogy, otherwise known as the Open House Collection released merely six months before Swing Shift, which is meant to cover the basis of Rik Emmett's guitar teaching.

Unlike the next two albums in the trilogy, the album is instrumental. Shannon Emmett, Rik's oldest daughter, plays the synthesizer on the two part suite "Ascending in St. Anne's" and "Secret Wishes".  She was only fourteen at the time.

Track listing
 "El Cuento del Gadjo" - 7:07
 "The Castle of Regret" - 3:17
 "Angelina's Smile" - 3:19
 "Buggy Ride" - 3:28
 "A Whisper Away" - 4:01
 "Ascending in St. Anne's" - 1:25
 "Secret Wishes" - 3:28
 "Acadian Dance" - 2:52
 "Souveniers" [sic] - 4:09
 "The Seventh Circle" - 2:07

Personnel
 Rik Emmett – guitars, synthesizers, vocals
 Steve Skingley - Bass
 Denton Young - Drums
 Randy Cooke – Percussion
 Marty Anderson - Keyboards
 Shannon Emmett - Synthesizer on "Ascending in St. Anne's" & "Secret Wishes"

Production
 Rik Emmett producer
 Tony Daniels engineer

References

External links
 Ten Invitations From the Mistress Of Mr. E Entry at the Official Rik Emmett Homepage

Rik Emmett albums
1997 albums
Open House Records albums
Instrumental albums
Concept albums